The Sony Ericsson W200i Walkman is a cellphone measuring 101 × 44 × 18mm (3.9 × 1.7 × 0.7 inches) and weighs 85g (3 oz). It features a VGA camera, an FM radio, and Sony's Walkman software, although it lacks Bluetooth.

The screen resolution is 128×160 pixels, screen size is 1.8″, and the internal memory is an average 27MB but this may be expanded using a Memory Stick Micro (M2).

The phone is Triband so it can use the GSM 900, 1800 & 1900 networks.

The W200 is available in four colors, Rhythm Black, Pulse White, Grey and Aquatic White.
UK mobile firm Orange released it in a Passion Pink.
This mobile is an upgrade to the popular K310 camera phone. 
It has a VGA camera that features 4x Digital Zoom and can take pictures up to a resolution of 640x480 pixels hardware or 1280x960 pixels with software interpolation. It also has Video Recording (3GP with AMR Audio) up to 176x144 pixels.

The included Memory Stick Micro is big enough to store 30+ songs and can be replaced with a card up to 2GB (8GB supported if the M2 is formatted in FAT32 format). It also has an FM radio which supports the RDS function.

The W200 interface and OS is closely similar to its predecessor Sony Ericsson W300i which has been one of the best selling Sony Ericsson phones. (see List of best-selling mobile phones)

Features

Music
 Walkman player 1.0  
 Supports MP3, AAC, mp4 and 3gp
 256MB Memory Stick Micro M2 included (size varies) 
 Disc2Phone music management software  
 Stereo headphones in the box (HPM-64) 
 FM radio with RDS 
    
Messaging
 CSTN screenpin
 SMS, MMS, e-mail.
   
Connectivity
 NetFront Internet browser  
 Infrared port  
 USB 2.0
 GPRS

Misc
 Java 6.7
 27MB Onboard Flash Memory (Depends on operator pre-customizations)
 FOTA

Supported networks 
 GSM 900, 1800, 1900

Release
Sony Ericsson W200 was announced in the second quarter of 2007. It was released in three variants: W200a (for the Americas), W200c (for China) and W200i (rest of the world). All the three variants had minor differences, like the languages available in the phone. Sony Ericsson launched W200i as the budget Walkman phone. It retailed at about USD 150 at its launch in the US. In UK it was initially available for 200 pounds and subsequently its price dropped to a 100 pounds.

Reception
W200 is mainly aimed for the youth who are looking for a reasonable yet a good quality music phone. W200 provides all the major music player features at almost half the price of any other phone in its category. This attribute was well appreciated by reviewers at different websites and magazines. CNET.uk said in its review: "The music features are one of the most impressive aspects of the handset."  Many reviewers criticized the lack of Bluetooth, since it was a music phone, but acknowledged the high quality music output and the value for money. With such features, Sony Ericsson W200 has gone on to become one of the best selling Walkman phones.

See also
 Sony Ericsson W300i

References

External links
 User Manuals / User Guides for W200i from Manualsmania
 Sony Ericsson web site

W200
Mobile phones introduced in 2007
Mobile phones with infrared transmitter